Birol is a Turkish given name for males and a Turkish surname. Notable people with the name include:

Given name:
 Birol Aksancak (born 1979), Turkish footballer
 Birol Hikmet (born 1982), Turkish footballer
 Birol Ünel (1961–2020), German actor
 Birol Özbilen (born 1983), Reiki Master

Surname:
 Fatih Birol, Turkish economist
 Şenol Birol (1936–2022), Turkish footballer

Turkish-language surnames
Turkish masculine given names